"AM to PM" is the debut single of American singer Christina Milian. Written by Milian, Christian Karlsson, and Pontus Winnberg and produced by the latter, it served as the lead single from her self-titled 2001 debut album and found commercial success in many countries, becoming a top-ten hit in the Flanders region of Belgium, Denmark, Ireland, the Netherlands, Norway, and the United Kingdom.

Release and promotion
Pushed by Milian's increasing prominence as a VJ on MTV, the single enjoyed worldwide success, reaching the top 10 in Denmark, Flanders, Ireland, the Netherlands, Norway, and the United Kingdom. Stateside, it peaked at number 27 on the Billboard Hot 100.

Critical reception
Chuck Taylor from Billboard compared the song to the work of Destiny's Child and Christina Aguilera and felt that  it may be "too entrenched in youth-pop to be taken seriously by those with an ear for the street".  Nonetheless, he stated that "with its pop-ping production and chirpy vocal, this could be one of the bolder breakthroughs of the year".

Music video
The music video for "AM to PM" was directed by Dave Meyers and premiered on Total Request Live on August 27, 2001. It starts with Milian waking up after going to bed that night. She then gets ready to leave the house, and decides to sneak out of the house. She turns off the alarm, hides from her mom, by hanging below the stairs. She stops the dog from barking by throwing him a bone and then exits the house. She grabs her backpack, which she had thrown out from the window in her room, and jumps in the backseat of her friends' car. She and her friends then go to a club, and they are able to skip the line by showing the bouncer a beeper that reads "AM to PM." She and her friends then proceed into the club and start to dance. They all dance and Christina dances on a stage with many background dancers. After Christina and her friends leave, she attempts to sneak back into her house. Her dad is reading the newspaper and the dog is barking again. She sees this and then runs around to enter the house through the backdoor. She sprints to her room and dives into her bed. Her dad checks on her, thinking that she's asleep, and she pretends to be. After he leaves, Christina says "from AM to PM," and the video ends.

Kevin Federline is featured in the main nightclub dance sequence throughout the video.

Track listings

US CD single
 "AM to PM" (album version) – 3:51
 "Between Me and You" (with Ja Rule) – 4:24
 "A Girl Like Me" (snippet) – 2:08
 "You Make Me Laugh" (snippet) – 1:34
 "When You Look at Me" (snippet) – 1:35
 "It Hurts When..." (snippet) – 2:04
 "Satisfaction Guaranteed" (snippet) – 2:34
 "AM to PM" (video)

US 12-inch single
A1. "AM to PM" (Hex Hector/Mac Quayle club mix)
A2. "AM to PM" (E-Smoove house mix)
B1. "AM to PM" (E-Smoove 4 Da Heads dub)
B2. "AM to PM" (Richard F's Understair dub)

UK CD single
 "AM to PM" (album version) – 3:51
 "AM to PM" (Ignorants remix) – 4:18
 "AM to PM" (E-Smoove house mix) – 7:22
 "AM to PM" (video)

UK 12-inch single
A1. "AM to PM" (album version) – 3:51
A2. "AM to PM" (Ignorants remix) – 4:18
B1. "AM to PM" (E-Smoove house mix) – 7:22

UK cassette single and European CD single
 "AM to PM" – 3:51
 "AM to PM" (E-Smoove house mix) – 7:22

Australian CD single
 "AM to PM" (radio edit) – 3:52
 "AM to PM" (Irv Gotti's Gutta remix) – 3:35
 "AM to PM" (Hex Hector/Mac Quayle club mix) – 6:19
 "AM to PM" (E-Smoove house mix) – 7:20
 "AM to PM" (video)

Japanese CD single
 "AM to PM" (radio edit) – 3:53
 "AM to PM" (Irv Gotti remix) – 3:37
 "AM to PM" (instrumental) – 3:43

Charts and certifications

Weekly charts

Year-end charts

Certifications

Release history

References

External links
 

2000 songs
2001 debut singles
Christina Milian songs
Music videos directed by Dave Meyers (director)
Song recordings produced by Bloodshy & Avant
Songs written by Christian Karlsson (DJ)
Songs written by Christina Milian
Songs written by Pontus Winnberg